Tots Tolentino (born on July 2, 1959) is a jazz musician from the Philippines.

Biography

Tots Tolentino's interest in jazz began at age 16 upon hearing recordings by Charlie Parker.
In 1977, he enrolled at the University of the Philippines Conservatory of Music where he studied flute under Prof. Eric Barcelo and played with the U.P. Jazz Ensemble, switching to saxophone. He afterwards enrolled at the Berklee College of Music in Boston, Massachusetts, under the tutelage of Joseph "Joe" Viola where he graduated magna cum laude in 1982.
His professional career as a first-call session musician in the Philippine recording industry 
culminated in his own first album in 1990.

Albums
Tots Tolentino has five solo albums to date, namely the self-titled Tots Tolentino (1990) and Inah (1991), both under Blackgold Records; and Color Real (1993) with Dypro Records.  In 2012 he released a Christmas album entitled Tots Tolentino Plays Vehnee Saturno Christmas Songs.  In 2015, he released another Christmas album under the Jesuit Communications Foundation, called God Rest Ye! (Christmas Jazz with Tots Tolentino).

Bands 

In the early 90s, Tots Tolentino fronted the group Buhay, a band composed of Pinoy jazz musicians Wowee Posadas (keyboards), Mar Dizon (drums), Meong Pacana (bass), and Tots Tolentino.

In the mid-1990s, he was in invited by the famed trumpeter Terumasa Hino to join the Asian Jazz All-Stars Power Quartet, a jazz group featuring four of Asia's prominent jazz musicians, namely pianist/organist Jeremy Monteiro from Singapore, guitarist Eugene Pao from Hong Kong, drummer Hong Chanutr Techatana-nan from Thailand, and saxophonist Tots Tolentino from the Philippines.

Tots joined Johnny Alegre AFFINITY in 2002, a Manila-based jazz group with frontman Johnny Alegre (guitar), Colby de la Calzada (contrabass), Elhmir Saison (piano), and Koko Bermejo (drums). Johnny Alegre AFFINITY released several albums and had been nominated for awards.

He was one of the founders and principal soloists of a large ensemble called The AMP Band, consisting of members from the Asosasyon ng Musikong Pilipino, hence its name.

Adobo Jazz

Tolentino participated in ensembles featured in the Adobo Jazz series of Pinoy Jazz anthology albums.  

 Bobby Enriquez All-Star Band, featuring Bobby Enriquez (piano) Emil Mijares (vibraphone) Nestor Gonzaga (trumpet) Abel Valdevia (alto sax) Tots Tolentino (tenor sax) Pikoy Villapando (baritone sax) Narding Sanchez (trombone) Roger Herrera (bass) Tony Velarde (drums) Nick Boogie (percussion)

 Johnny Alegre AFFINITY, featuring Johnny Alegre (guitar), Tots Tolentino (alto sax), Elhmir Saison (piano), Colby dela Calzada (bass), and Koko Bermejo (drums) 

 Monk's Jazz Bureau, featuring Terry Undag (trumpet), Tots Tolentino (alto sax), Marc Lopez (piano), Colby dela Calzada (bass), and George San Jose (drums)

 ETS Band, featuring Elhmir Saison (keyboards), Tots Tolentino (clarinet), Janno Queyquep (guitar), Noel Asistores (bass), Mar Dizon (drums), and Wilson Matias (2nd keyboards)

Advocacy 
Tots Tolentino helped organize the Asosasyon ng Musikong Pilipino (trans: Association of Filipino Musicians). to professionalize Filipino musicians wages, contracts and render financial assistance, legal counsel and coordination with government agencies.

Academe
Tots joined the faculty of the University of Santo Tomas Conservatory of Music (UST Music) and is presently the head of its Jazz Studies program and the conductor of the UST Jazz Ensemble. The Filipino Music Art Collective lists Tots Tolentino as one of their mentors.

Discography

Solo albums

Compilation albums

Group albums

Session work

Awards

References

External links
 
 Tots Tolentino on Spotify
 
 
 
 Asosasyon ng Musikong Pilipino (AMP)
 Discography of Tots Tolentino at AllMusic.com
 
 Official biography of Tots Tolentino in the Cultural Center of the Philippines website

Filipino jazz musicians
Filipino jazz composers

1959 births
Living people
21st-century jazz composers
20th-century jazz composers
Saxophonists